Wicquinghem is a commune in the Pas-de-Calais department in the Hauts-de-France region of France.

Geography
Wicquinghem is located 12 miles (19 km) northeast of Montreuil-sur-Mer, on the D156 road, 2miles (3k) east of Hucqueliers. Its name is derived from the Flemish Wikingem, which may have its origin in the Viking occupation of the region in the ninth century.

Population

Places of interest
 The church of St.Sylvain, dating from the sixteenth century.
 Traces of an old castle.
 The Chapel of Notre-Dame-de-Bon-Secours, dating from the eighteenth century.

See also
Communes of the Pas-de-Calais department

References

Communes of Pas-de-Calais